Mirza Gholam Reza Esfahani, known as Khoshnevis (1829-30 - 1886-87), was a late 19th-century Iranian calligrapher and epigraphist. He was one of the masters of Persian calligraphy, in particular the Nastaliq, Shekasteh-Nastaliq and Shekasteh scripts.

He was born in the capital Tehran, and died there as well. He signed his works with two invocations, either "Ya Ali madad" or "Gholam Reza, Ya Ali madadast".

References

Further reading
 

19th-century Iranian artists
Iranian calligraphers
People of Qajar Iran
People from Tehran
19th-century births
1880s deaths

Year of birth uncertain
Year of death uncertain